The protein leverage hypothesis states that human beings will prioritize the consumption of protein in food over other dietary components, and will eat until protein needs have been met, regardless of energy content, thus leading to over-consumption of foodstuffs when their protein content is low.

This hypothesis has been put forward as a potential explanation of the obesity epidemic. Empirical tests have provided some evidence to confirm the hypothesis with one study suggesting that this could be a link between ultra-processed foods and the prevalence of obesity in the developed world.

In 1995, Australian researcher Susanna Holt developed the concept of satiety value, a measure of how much a given food is likely to satisfy the hunger of someone. High protein foods have been found to have high satiety values, though these are outmatched by potatoes and oats (which have a low glycemic index). Fruits rank similarly to high protein foods (likely due to their high level of dietary fibre).

The 2020 popular science book "Eat Like the Animals: What Nature Teaches Us about the Science of Healthy Eating" details the experiments of David Raubenheimer and Stephen Simpson, the two University of Sydney researchers who developed the protein leverage hypothesis.

References  

Obesity
Hypotheses